Ernst Ogris (9 December 1967 – 29 March 2017) was an Austrian football player.

Club career
Ogris started his career at Austria Wien, but left them for St. Pölten in 1988. A crowd favorite there, Ernstl scored 18 goals in 64 games for them then joined Admira/Wacker with whom he lost the 1992 Austrian Cup Final. He had his most successful period with Admira and had a season in the German Zweite (Second) Bundesliga with Hertha BSC.

After another short stint at Admira, Ogris played at several lower league sides.

International career
He made his debut for Austria in a June 1991 European Championship qualifier against Denmark in which he immediately scored a goal. It proved to be his sole international match.

Personal life
He was the younger brother of Andreas Ogris.

Death
In March 2017 Ogris was struck by a viral infection which affected his kidney, liver, heart and brain. He was artificially put in a coma KFJ-Krankenhaus and died there on 29 March.

References

External links
 

1967 births
2017 deaths
Footballers from Vienna
Association football forwards
Austrian footballers
Austria international footballers
FK Austria Wien players
SKN St. Pölten players
FC Admira Wacker Mödling players
Hertha BSC players
SV Schwechat players
Austrian Football Bundesliga players
2. Bundesliga players
Austrian expatriate footballers
Expatriate footballers in Germany
Austrian expatriate sportspeople in Germany